Charlene is the third studio album by American singer Tweet. It was released on February 26, 2016, by eOne Music. "Won't Hurt Me" was released on September 21, 2015, as the album's lead single. The second single "Magic" was released on January 21, 2016, followed by "Neva Shouda Left Ya" on February 11, 2016. Rolling Stone listed Charlene as the 12th best R&B album of 2016.

Background

In 2007, Tweet departed from longtime friend Missy Elliott's The Goldmind Inc. label and signed to Jheryl Busby and Mike City's record label, Umbrella Recordings. There, she began recording material for her third album along with producers Nisan Stewart, Warryn Campbell and Novel. Tentatively titled Love, Tweet, the album was preceded by the buzz single "Good Bye My Dear", a collaboration with rapper T.I., and expected to be released on April 8, 2008. However, the release of lead single "Anymore" failed to materialize.

In 2010, Tweet parted ways with Umbrella due to lack of promotion and ongoing delays. In September 2011, Tweet signed to MC Lyte's record label DuBose Music Group. In June 2012, she began posting previously unreleased material from the It's Me Again and Love, Tweet recording sessions on her new website as a part of her weekly SoundCloud-hosted special, Tweet Tuesdays. She released an extended play titled Simply Tweet on February 26, 2013, through DuBose. The EP reached the top 30 on both the US Billboard Independent Albums and the Top R&B/Hip-Hop Albums charts.

After heaps of label troubles when Love, Tweet was shelved, in July 2015, Tweet confirmed that she had signed with the independent eOne Music label and confirmed that a new album was to be completed and released. Initially slated to feature vast production credits from Elliott and expected to be released on January 22, 2016, Charlene was pushed back to February 26, 2016, with further retooling and added contributions from other producers such as longtime collaborators Craig Brockman, Charlie Bereal, Nisan Stewart, and Timbaland.

Critical reception

Charlene  was met with generally favorable reviews from music critic. On review aggregator Metacritic, the album received a score of 74 out of 100 based on four reviews. AllMusic editor Andy Kellman called the album "a relaxed, dimly lit collection, much of which could be replicated in an intimate setting with a simple instrumental setup." He noted that "Tweet has lost nothing vocally while gaining a decade's worth of wisdom. As ever, she exudes euphoria, longing, and irritation with the slightest of adjustments, and remains one of the best soft-voiced, low-volume singers around." Now critic Kevin Ritchie found that "as on her other best material, Charlene contains some of the most beautiful vocal arrangements in contemporary R&B. "Addicted", "Magic", "Priceless" and "Fool No Mo" are as sharply written and realized as they are unapologetically indulgent of heady atmospherics, each song its own exaltation of the understated power of Tweet's singular voice."

Mosi Reeves, writing for Spin, felt that "one of the pleasures of Charlene is how we can now enjoy Tweet – years removed from the burden of carrying Aaliyah's legacy – as a startlingly unique voice in her own right, a fact that we sometimes forgot during her brief reign on Top 40." Scott Glaysher from HipHopDX found that "the project doesn't sound much different from her 2013 EP or her 2005 LP [...] Tweet should by no means start teaming up with the likes of DJ Mustard [...] but the album should have come with more excitement. "Somebody Else Will" with Missy Elliott has a minor hip hop edge but other than that, not much pushes the proverbial envelope."

Chart performance
Charlene debuted and peaked at number 42 on the US Billboard 200 in the week of March 29, 2016. It also reached number six on the Top R&B/Hip-Hop Albums chart, becoming Tweet's third consecutive album to enter the top ten, while also reaching number four on the Independent Albums chart.

Track listing

Sample credits
 "Somebody Else Will" contains a sample from "Be Pavadinimo (Untitled)" written and performed by Giedrius Kuprevičius.

Personnel
Credits adapted from the liner notes of Charlene.

 Charlene "Tweet" Keys – vocals ; production ; guitar ; executive production
 Charlie Bereal – production ; guitar ; bass ; keyboards ; drums 
 Craig Brockman – keyboards ; production ; bass 
 Chris Brown – bass, production 
 Missy Elliott – vocals 
 Marc Ellus – mixing 
 Chris Godbey – mixing 
 Paul Grosso – creative direction
 Paul Horabin – recording, vocal editing, vocal recording ; additional bass recording, drum recording, guitar recording 
 Andrew Kelley – art direction, design
 Kris Kolp – recording
 EJ Martin – percussion 
 Eric Morgeson – mastering
 Jairus Mozee – bass, production 
 Dion Nuble – percussion 
 Qmillion – mixing 
 Tyren Redd – photography
 Jubu Smith – guitar, production ; bass 
 Nisan Stewart – drums ; production 
 Chelsea Stratton – liner notes
 Scott Swanson – recording
 Phil "Phillionaire" Thornton – executive production
 Timbaland – instruments, production

Charts

Weekly charts

Year-end charts

References

2016 albums
Albums produced by Craig Brockman
Albums produced by Timbaland
Tweet (singer) albums